Rubén Alejandro Tanucci (born March 23, 1964 in Avellaneda, Argentina) is a former Argentine footballer who played for clubs of Argentina, Chile and Peru.

After he retired from playing, Tanucci became a football manager. He led Club Atlético Temperley during the second half of the 2010–11 Primera B Metropolitana season. Tanucci also managed Mexican third division side Atlético Reynosa in 2014. He is currently assistant manager to Lucas Pusineri at Colombian Categoría Primera A side Deportivo Cali.

Teams
  C.D. Nicanor Otamendi 1985
  Temperley 1985-1987
  Estudiantes de La Plata 1987-1988
  Huracán 1988-1989
  Racing de Córdoba 1989-1990
  Unión Española 1990-1991
  Deportes La Serena 1991-1992
  Coquimbo Unido 1992-1993
  Palestino 1993-1994
  Alianza Lima 1994-1995
  Palestino 1995-1996
  Huachipato 1996-1998
  Unión Española 1998

References

 Profile at BDFA 

1964 births
Living people
Argentine footballers
Argentine expatriate footballers
Club Atlético Temperley footballers
Club Atlético Independiente footballers
Estudiantes de La Plata footballers
Racing de Córdoba footballers
Club Atlético Huracán footballers
Club Deportivo Palestino footballers
Coquimbo Unido footballers
C.D. Huachipato footballers
Club Alianza Lima footballers
Unión Española footballers
Deportes La Serena footballers
Primera B de Chile players
Chilean Primera División players
Argentine Primera División players
Expatriate footballers in Chile
Expatriate footballers in Peru
Association football midfielders
Sportspeople from Avellaneda